The Players Tour Championship 2011/2012 – Event 2 was a professional minor-ranking snooker tournament that took place between 6–10 August 2011 at the South West Snooker Academy in Gloucester, England.

Judd Trump won in the final 4–0 against Ding Junhui.

Prize fund and ranking points
The breakdown of prize money and ranking points of the event is shown below: 

1 Only professional players can earn ranking points.

Main draw

Preliminary rounds

Round 1 
Best of 7 frames

Round 2 
Best of 7 frames

Main rounds

Top half

Section 1

Section 2

Section 3

Section 4

Bottom half

Section 5

Section 6

Section 7

Section 8

Finals

Century breaks 
 

 141, 121, 120  Judd Trump
 140  James Wattana
 140  Barry Pinches
 137, 135, 124  Graeme Dott
 137  Dominic Dale
 134  Ian Burns
 134  Ali Carter
 133, 106  Adam Duffy
 133  Jamie O'Neill
 129  Ryan Day
 128, 123  Ding Junhui
 125  Matthew Stevens
 124  Justin Astley
 124  Rod Lawler
 121, 102  Jamie Burnett
 118, 110  Mark Selby
 116  Mike Dunn
 113, 106  Anthony McGill
 112, 106  Xiao Guodong

 112  David Morris
 109, 100  Ronnie O'Sullivan
 107  Liam Monk
 107  Neil Robertson
 106, 100  Kyren Wilson
 106  Mark Davis
 105, 103  Ken Doherty
 104  Alan McManus
 104  Alfie Burden
 103  Joe Swail
 103  Marco Fu
 102  Steve Davis
 102  Fergal O'Brien
 101, 100  Mark Allen
 101  Andy Hicks
 101  Craig Steadman
 101  Jimmy Robertson
 100  Chen Zhe
 100  Dave Harold

References

External links 
Picture Perfect: PTC2 From The SWSA at Pro Snooker Blog
Picture Perfect: PTC2 Special II at Pro Snooker Blog

02
2011 in English sport
August 2011 sports events in the United Kingdom